Lithuania is a country in the Baltic region of Europe.  The most populous of the Baltic states, Lithuania has  of coastline consisting of the continental coast and the "Curonian Spit" coast. Lithuania's major warm-water port of Klaipėda (Memel) lies at the narrow mouth of Curonian Lagoon, a shallow lagoon extending south to Kaliningrad and separated from the Baltic sea by Curonian Spit, where Kuršių Nerija National Park was established for its remarkable sand dunes.

The Neman River and some of its tributaries are used for internal shipping (in 2000, 89 inland ships carried 900,000 tons of cargo, which is less than 1% of the total goods traffic).

Situated between 56.27 and 53.53 latitudes and 20.56 and 26.50 longitudes, Lithuania is glacially flat, except for morainic hills in the western uplands and eastern highlands no higher than 300 metres. The terrain is marked by numerous small lakes and swamps, and a mixed forest zone covers over 33% of the country. The growing season lasts 169 days in the east and 202 days in the west, with most farmland consisting of sandy- or clay-loam soils. Limestone, clay, sand, and gravel are Lithuania's primary natural resources, but the coastal shelf offers perhaps  of oil deposits, and the southeast could provide high yields of iron ore and granite.

Geographical position 

Lithuania is situated on the eastern shore of the Baltic Sea. Lithuania's boundaries have changed several times since 1918, but they have been stable since 1945. About the size of West Virginia, it is larger than Belgium, Denmark, Latvia, the Netherlands, or Switzerland. Lithuania borders Latvia on the north, Belarus on the east and south, and Poland and the Kaliningrad region of Russia on the southwest. It is a country of gently rolling hills, many forests, rivers and streams, and lakes. Its principal natural resource is agricultural land.

Lithuania's northern neighbor is Latvia. The two countries share a border that extends 453 kilometres. Lithuania's eastern border with Belarus is longer, stretching 502 kilometers. The border with Poland on the south is relatively short, only 91 kilometers, but it is very busy because of international traffic. Lithuania also has a 227-kilometer border with Russia. Russian territory adjacent to Lithuania is Kaliningrad Oblast, which is the northern part of the former German East Prussia, including the city of Kaliningrad. Finally, Lithuania has 108 kilometers of Baltic seashore with an ice-free harbor at Klaipėda. The Baltic coast offers sandy beaches and pine forests and attracts thousands of vacationers.

According to some geographers, the geographical midpoint of Europe is just north of Lithuania's capital, Vilnius.

Topography and drainage 

Lithuania lies at the edge of the North European Plain. Its landscape was shaped by the glaciers of the last Ice Age, which retreated about 25,000–22,000 years BP (Before Present). Lithuania's terrain is an alternation of moderate lowlands and highlands. The highest elevation is 297.84 meters above sea level, found in the eastern part of the republic and separated from the uplands of the western region of Samogitia by the fertile plains of the southwestern and central regions. The majority of the lakes are found in the eastern part of the country. The largest river is the Nemunas (total length ), which originates in Belarus. The other larger waterways are the Neris, Venta, and Šešupė rivers. However, only  of Lithuania's rivers are navigable.

Once a heavily forested land, Lithuania's territory today consists of only 32.8 percent woodlands—primarily pine, spruce, and birch forests. Ash and oak are very scarce. The forests are rich in mushrooms and berries, as well as a variety of plants.

Climate 

Lithuania has a humid continental climate (Dfb in the Köppen climate classification). Temperatures occasionally reach  in summer. Winters when easterly flows from Siberia predominate, like 1941–42, 1955–56 and 1984–85, are very cold, whereas winters dominated by westerly maritime airflows like 1924–25, 1960–61 and 1988–89 are mild with temperatures above freezing a normal occurrence.  occurs almost every winter. Snow occurs every year, it can be snowing from October to April. In some years sleet can fall in September or May. The growing season lasts 202 days in the western part of the country and 169 days in the eastern part. Severe storms are rare in the eastern part of Lithuania and common nearer the coast.

The longest measured temperature records from the Baltic area cover about 250 years. The data show that there were warm periods during the latter half of the eighteenth century and that the nineteenth century was a relatively cool period. An early twentieth century warming culminated in the 1930s, followed by a smaller cooling that lasted until the 1960s. A warming trend has persisted since then.

Lithuania experienced a drought in 2002, causing forest and peat bog fires. The country suffered along with the rest of Northwestern Europe during a heatwave in the summer of 2006.

Examples

General averages

Cities

Environment

Concerned with environmental deterioration, Lithuanian governments have created several national parks and reservations. The country's flora and fauna have suffered, however, from an almost fanatical drainage of land for agricultural use. Environmental problems of a different nature were created by the development of environmentally unsafe industries. Air pollution problems exist mainly in the cities, such as Vilnius, Kaunas, Jonava, Mažeikiai, Elektrėnai, and Naujoji Akmenė—the sites of fertilizer and other chemical plants, an oil refinery, power station, and a cement factory.

Water quality has also been an issue. The city of Kaunas, with a population of about 400,000, had no water purification plant until 1999; sewage was sent directly into the Neman River. Tertiary wastewater treatment is scheduled to come on-line in 2007. River and lake pollution are other legacies of Soviet carelessness with the environment. The Courland Lagoon, for example, separated from the Baltic Sea by a strip of high dunes and pine forests, is about 85 percent contaminated. Beaches in the Baltic resorts, such as the well-known vacation area of Palanga, are frequently closed for swimming because of contamination. Forests affected by acid rain are found in the vicinity of Jonava, Mažeikiai, and Elektrėnai, which are the chemical, oil, and power-generation centers. Lithuania was among the first former Soviet republics to introduce environmental regulations. However, because of Moscow's emphasis on increasing production and because of numerous local violations, technological backwardness, and political apathy, serious environmental problems now exist.

Natural hazards:
hurricane-force storms, blizzards, droughts, floods

Environment—current issues:
contamination of soil and groundwater with petroleum products and chemicals at former Soviet military bases

Environment—international agreements:

 party to:

Air Pollution, Air Pollution-Nitrogen Oxides, Air Pollution-Persistent Organic Pollutants, Air Pollution-Sulphur 85, Air Pollution-Sulphur 94, Air Pollution-Volatile Organic Compounds, Biodiversity, Climate Change, Climate Change-Kyoto Protocol, Desertification, Endangered Species, Environmental Modification, Hazardous Wastes, Law of the Sea, Ozone Layer Protection, Ship Pollution, Wetlands

 signed, but not ratified:

Natural resources 

Lithuania has an abundance of limestone, clay, quartz sand, gypsum sand, and dolomite, which are suitable for making high-quality cement, glass, and ceramics. There also is an ample supply of mineral water, but energy sources and industrial materials are all in short supply. Oil was discovered in Lithuania in the 1950s, but only a few wells operate, and all that do are located in the western part of the country. It is estimated that the Baltic Sea shelf and the western region of Lithuania hold commercially viable amounts of oil, but if exploited this oil would satisfy only about 20 percent of Lithuania's annual need for petroleum products for the next twenty years. Lithuania has a large amount of thermal energy along the Baltic Sea coast which could be used to heat hundreds of thousands of homes, as is done in Iceland. In addition, iron ore deposits have been found in the southern region of Lithuania. But commercial exploitation of these deposits probably would require strip mining, which is environmentally unsound. Moreover, exploitation of these resources will depend on Lithuania's ability to attract capital and technology from abroad.

Natural resources:
peat, arable land, amber

Land use:

 arable land: 33.48%
 permanent crops: 0.47%
 other: 66.05% (2011)

Irrigated land:
13.4 km2 (2011)

Total renewable water resources:
24.9 km3 (2011)

Area and boundaries 

Area:

 Total: 65,300 km2
 Land: 62,680 km2
 Water: 2,620 km2

Comparative area
Australia comparative: slightly smaller (5.5%) than Tasmania
Canada comparative: about 9% smaller than New Brunswick
United Kingdom comparative: about 17% smaller than Scotland
United States comparative: slightly larger (4%) than West Virginia

Land boundaries:

 Total: 1,574 km
 Border countries: Belarus 680 km, Latvia 576 km, Poland 91 km, Russia (Kaliningrad) 227 km

Coastline: . The coastline consists of 20 kilometres from Klaipėda, 50 kilometres at Cape Nehrung, and 21 kilometres in the region of Palanga and the mouth of the Šventoji river. "The Memelland occupies two-thirds of the Lithuanian coast-line."

Maritime claims:

 Territorial sea: 
 Exclusive Economic Zone:  with 

Elevation extremes:

 Lowest point: Baltic Sea 0 m
 Highest point: Aukštojas Hill

See also 
List of protected areas of Lithuania
 Lithuania

References

External links 

 Kursiu Nerija National Park